This is a list of instructors in the Clarion South Writers Workshop, an annual writers' workshop for science fiction, fantasy, and speculative literature writers.

 Lee Battersby (2007)
 Simon Brown (2007)
 Jack Dann (2009, 2004)
 Ellen Datlow (2005)
 Terry Dowling (2004)
 Gardner Dozois (2007)
 David G. Hartwell (2004)
 Robert Hood (2007)
 Nalo Hopkinson (2004)
 Ian Irvine (2005)
 Trent Jamieson (2009)
 Margo Lanagan (2009, 2007, 2005)
 Kelly Link (2007)
 Lucy Sussex (2004)
 Michael Swanwick (2005)
 Jeff Vandermeer (2009)
 Scott Westerfeld (2005)
 Kim Wilkins (2004)
 Sean Williams  (2009, 2005)

See also
 List of Clarion South Writers Workshop Alumni
 Clarion Workshop
 List of Clarion Writers Workshop Instructors
 List of Clarion Writers Workshop Alumni
 Clarion West Writers Workshop
 Clarion South Writers Workshop

Creative writing programs
Science fiction organizations
Clarion South Writers Workshop Instructors
Clarion South Writers Workshop Instructors
Clarion South Writers Workshop Instructors